A tesseract is a four-dimensional analog of the cube.

Tesseract may also refer to:

Arts and entertainment

Literature
 Tesseract, a concept for spacetime travel in the novel A Wrinkle in Time, by Madeleine L'Engle (1962), and subsequent novel, An Acceptable Time (1989).
 The Tesseract (novel), by Alex Garland (1998)
 Tesseract / Hopeless, a character in the 2010 book Skulduggery Pleasant: Mortal Coil, by Derek Landy

Film
 The Tesseract (film), a 2003 film based on the Alex Garland novel
 Tesseract, the prison of Eva Unit-01 in the animated film Evangelion: 3.0 You Can (Not) Redo
 Tesseract, a location inside Gargantua used for communicating through time in the film Interstellar
 The Tesseract, the version of the Cosmic Cube in the Marvel Cinematic Universe (MCU)
 Tesseract, a means of space travel in:
 A Wrinkle in Time (2003 film)
 A Wrinkle in Time (2018 film)

Music
 Tesseract (band), a British progressive metal band

Games
 Tesseract, a 3D game engine, fork of the Cube 2 Engine. This engine is often mistaken with the game it was made for, that is also named Tesseract.
 Beyond the Tesseract, a 1983 text based adventure game for the TRS-80

Other uses
 Tesseract (software), an optical character recognition (OCR) engine
 Yamaha Tesseract, a concept 4-wheeled motorcycle
 Tesseract, an art installation at the California Institute of Technology
 Tesseract Watches, a luxury watch brand